Tony Schumacher may refer to:

 Tony Schumacher (drag racer) (born 1969), American drag racer
 Tony Schumacher (kayaker) (born 1976), Australian sprint canoeist
 Tony Schumacher (German author) (1848–1931), German children books author
 Tony Schumacher (English author), English author, screenwriter, and broadcaster

See also

 Toni Schumacher (born 1954), German football goalkeeper from 1972 through 1992
 Anton Schumacher (born 1938), German football goalkeeper from 1960 through 1968